Wild Horse Rodeo is a 1937 American Western film directed by George Sherman and starring Robert Livingston, Ray Corrigan, and Max Terhune. Written by Oliver Drake and Betty Burbridge, based on a story by Drake and Gilbert Wright, the film is about a champion rodeo rider who returns to his home town in search of a legendary wild horse called Cyclone. The film is part of the Three Mesquiteers series of B-movies produced by Republic Pictures. Wild Horse Rodeo was the first film directed by George Sherman, who later directed numerous Western films for Republic, Columbia Pictures, and Universal Pictures.

Cast
 Robert Livingston as Stony Brooke
 Ray Corrigan as Tucson Smith
 Max Terhune as Lullaby Joslin
 June Martel as Alice Harkley
 Walter Miller as Colonel Nye
 Edmund Cobb as Hank Bain
 William Gould as Harkley
 Jack Ingram as Jim
 Roy Rogers as Singer (as Dick Weston)
 Henry Isabell as Slim

References

External links
 

1937 films
1937 Western (genre) films
American black-and-white films
1930s English-language films
Films directed by George Sherman
Films shot in Lone Pine, California
Republic Pictures films
Three Mesquiteers films
American Western (genre) films
Films produced by Sol C. Siegel
1930s American films